Bertsolaritza  or bertsolarism is the art of singing extemporaneously composed songs in Basque according to various melodies and rhyming patterns. Bertsos can be composed at a variety of occasions but are performed generally by one or various bertsolaris onstage in an event arranged for the purpose or as a sideshow, in homage ceremonies, in benefit lunches and suppers, with friends or at a competition. Such a sung piece of composition is called a bertso, the person who sings it is called a bertsolari and the art of composing bertsos is called bertsolaritza in 
Basque. Traditionally these were sung by men but there is an increasing number of young female bertsolaris today.

Usually the Basque terms are used in Spanish and French but the Spanish terms versolarismo and bertsolarismo and the French terms bertsularisme (from Zuberoan bertsularitza), bertsolarisme and versification are also used.

Bertso
A bertso consists of two main components: the spontaneous verse and the melody to which it is sung. The famous modern-day bertsolari Xabier Amuriza defined it in a bertso as:

Many different forms of metre exist for bertsos but 4 of the commonly encountered ones are the zortziko txiki "small of eight", zortziko handi "big of eight", hamarreko txiki "small of ten" and hamarreko handi "big of ten". An example of a Zortziko Txiki is the first stanza of the bertso Aitorren Izkuntz Zarra "Aitor's Ancient Language" by Z. Andonegi:

The zortziko txiki is called the "small of eight" as the first lerro or "line" contains 7 oinak or "syllables" (literally called "feet"), followed by 6 syllables in the next line. Such a pair of lines is called a puntu, a "point", 4 puntu (or 8 lines) in total form one stanza in a zortziko txiki. The rhyme is carried in the lines of 6 syllables. The zortziko handi on the other hand contains 10 syllables in the first line, followed by 8 in the second. The hamarreko txiki and hamarreko handi only differ in the number of lines, of which they have 10 rather than 8.

An error in the rhyme is called a poto.

Music
There are scores of possible tunes which can be used for singing a bertso, stemming from traditional songs that once caught on and embedded themselves in folk culture. They are all, however, unaccompanied.

Occasions and presentation
Bertsos can be composed in a variety of settings and manners. The most elaborate forms are usually encountered at a formal bertsolari txapelketa, a "bertsolari competition" where a group of bertsolaris compete against each other for the txapela, the "winner's beret". At a formal competition the bertsolari are called upon to compose and sing different kinds of bertsos by the gai-jartzaile, the "subject setter". The gai-jartzaile informs the bertsolari(s) of the type of challenge, which tune they have to use, and the metre. Some common bertso challenges include:
 Hasierako Agurra "The Initial Greeting": the bertsolari has to address the audience at the start of the day's competition, usually with a free choice of metre and topic
 Gartzelako Lana "Prison Cell Task": the bertsolari has to compose and sing a bertso to a given topic.
 Elkarrizketa "Conversation": two bertsolaris have to deal with the topic together, singing the stanzas in turns and responding to the previous statement. Again the topic is given.
 Puntua Jarrita "Point Given": the jartzaile sings a puntu and the bertsolari has to complete it, staying within the given tune and metre.
 Hitza Emanda "Word Given": the jartzaile gives a key word to the bertsolari who has to compose a bertso containing this word.
 Oinak Emanda "Rhymes Given": the bertsolari is given the four (or more, depending on the metre required) rhyming words and is required to compose the bertso "around" these rhyming words.
 Txapeldunaren Agurra "The Winner's Farewell": here the bertsolari is allowed to compose their farewell to the audience.

Topics
Any topic can occur in a bertso, anything from world politics to a humorous discussion about sex. Nowadays, the topic most used is politics. Bertsolaris criticize the state they are living on today's society. A bertsolari might for example be asked to pretend to be a 17-year-old girl who has come home at 3 am to realise she has lost her house keys and must ring the doorbell. Bertsolaris may be required to compose an argument between two family members or to look at a topic from a philosophical point of view.
The audience and the judges value humor as much as poetic value.

Language
Bertsos are always sung in Basque. Because it is primarily an oral art form, every bertsolari is free to use his or her own dialect and there is no requirement to use Standard Basque. For this reason the orthography and grammatical forms used in publications of bertsos often diverge from the standard language even today to accommodate for dialect forms. For example, h is silent in Western dialects, so it is generally not written in old bertsos from those dialects, and ll and ñ are used much more often than in Standard Basque; and ü appears in the texts of Souletin bertsos.
The use of dialectal forms may ease finding a suitable verse.

For example, the bertso Ürz' aphal bat by Etxahun was composed in his native Souletin dialect. If this was given in modern Standard Basque, it would not only be altered radically but also break the syllable structure of the bertso:

History

Late 18th century onwards
There exists evidence of bertso singing and written samples of akin bertso poems ("kopla zaharrak") since the late 15th century, e. g. bertso stories transmitted orally for generations in Soule, attestation of bertso singing in funerary rites of Biscay. It is unclear exactly how old this tradition is but the modern recorded history of bertsolaritza dates back to the beginning of the 19th century. Bertsolaris were for the most part illiterate people, who performed in informal situations. As such, they did not consider themselves as poets or a formal institution. However, they enjoyed great popularity and people often retained from memory their bertsos. Many of the most famous bertsolaris of this period came from the central province of Gipuzkoa. One of the earliest and most famous of these was a man called Fernando Bengoetxea Altuna. He was commonly known as Pernando Amezketarra, "Pernando from Amezketa (a village in Gipuzkoa)" and both a much loved bertsolari and trickster.

Coinciding with a turbulent period in Basque history (the Carlist Wars, World War I and World War II, the Spanish Civil War, Spain under Franco) bertsos were a popular way of reflecting on current issues and events, like in Norteko ferrokarrilla, on railway. Although bertsos which were considered to be worthy of passing on had been passed on orally before, the bertso-paperak, "bertso papers", became popular in this period and are the main source of information on these early bertsos today. They could become an effective means of spreading support for one political position or another during the Carlist Wars, e. g. Muñagorriren bertsoak.

Txirrita's period and postwar period
In the run-up to the Spanish Civil War, two kinds of bertsolari started to be distinguished, the eskolatuak, the "studied" bertsolaris who were aware of written Basque literature, and the eskolatu gabeak, the "unstudied" bertsolariak who were not as literate, e. g. Txirrita. The former, e. g. Basarri, were encouraged and advocated for by the Basque nationalist theoretician Aitzol, eventually tortured and killed by Spanish nationalist forces in the 1936 military uprising. He was the actual driving force behind the first major championship held in 1935 and the ensuing 1936 edition, while the Spanish Civil War put a halt to the national championships until 1960.

In the wake of the Civil War (1936-1937 in the Basque Country), all advancement on recognition of the bertsolaritza and Basque culture came to an end. Repression and hunger demoted the performances to low-key events, basically in a friend and family environment, since the new Francoist rule regarded this cultural activity with suspicion.

Social bertsolaritza
As the tight regime opened up in the 1950s, on-stage performances alongside provincial championships started to be held, with the bertsolaritza taking on a higher public profile. In this period, the pairs Lopategi and Azpillaga from the Spanish Basque Country and Mattin and Xalbador from the French Basque Country should be highlighted. In 1967, a controversial national championship took place in San Sebastian, when sadly frictions over the language gap between the eastern (French) and western dialects came to a head (contender Uztapide vs Xalbador).

Rise of new bertsolaritza
There were no more national championships until 1980, in San Sebastian. This time the celebration meeting of improvised poetry was attended by an audience of some 10,000 people, where a new kind of bertsolari emerged, Xabier Amuriza, one who had methodically re-learnt the Basque language and the way of fashioning bertsos (in prison), as opposed to the previous in-born bertsolaris. New ways of learning the art of singing extemporaneous verses were set up, i.e. schools, resulting in new generations of bertsolaris, such as the young Jon Sarasua, who qualified to the final in the 1986 national championship.

In the 90s, the educated new generations came to the spotlight, with Andoni Egaña from Zarautz bridging the generation gap between the largely rural uneducated or semi-educated bertsolaris from the old school and the new educated urban youths. The new bertsolaris were more technical and able to deal with almost all kind of issues in society, with young girls starting to stand out too. Furthermore, especially in the 2000s, young bertsolaris show a concern in forms and in opening up to new trends, like hip-hop or theatrical performances, instead of staying put on the stage.

Today the championships are conducted both at the provincial level and at the national level. Since having started again, they have drawn increasingly large crowds and the popularity of certain bertsolaris coupled with a renewed effort to foster traditional Basque culture have rejuvenated this tradition since the 80s, while an effort is being made to get close to other international extemporaneous verse traditions and mix different art disciplines. Many young people today have the opportunity to study bertsolaritza as a school subject or attend one of the many bertso schools for adults which today can be found in all 7 provinces of the Basque Country.

On December 13, 2009, the Main or National Contest (Txapelketa Nagusia) held on a 4-year basis took place at the Bilbao Exhibition Centre (BEC), with a massive turnout of 15,000. For the first time in the history of bertsolaritza, a woman, Maialen Lujanbio, won the contest after contending in the finals against the young Amets Arzallus, so taking over the txapela (or winner's  beret) from Andoni Egaña, winner of four Main Contests in a row since 1993.

Basque Television routinely broadcasts the championships and has programmes about bertsolaritza such as Hitzetik Hortzera which has been running since 1988.

Navarre and the French Basque Country
Both Navarre and the Northern provinces have begun to participate in the renaissance of the bertsolari tradition but with some conspicuous differences, mainly due to sociolinguistic issues. While Basque in the Autonomous Community enjoys relatively sound position, in the other provinces the transmission and use of Basque is weaker, especially in the North. Here, the bertso tradition almost vanished following the death of the veteran bertsolaris Martin Treku (Mattin) and Fernando Aire (Xalbador) (1981 and 1976) with only a handful of senior bertsolaris staging performances thereafter. In the north of Navarre, bertsolaris were also scarce with some notable exceptions such as Manolo Arozena.

In addition, the tradition in these parts of the Basque Country played down technical aspects of the verse (especially the rhyme), taking on forms closer to extemporaneous song. In the 90s, bertsolaritza began to show a renewed vitality in the north of Navarre thanks to young people keen on the practice, while at the turn of the century concerted efforts were made in the northern provinces aimed at restoring the bertsolaritza tradition by establishing bertso learning as an extracurricular activity in Basque language schools. The new bertsolaris emerging from these schools follow the prevailing bertso manners of the western provinces. The skill of some of these young bertsolaris such as Sustrai Colina or Amets Arzallus (from Labourd) is worth mentioning. The bertso school of Oiartzun, a town with close ties to the bordering areas of Navarre and nearby Labourd has played a major role in the efforts to sustain the bertsolaritza tradition.

Bertsolaritza in the community and competitions

Bertsolaritza is practised both formally at competitions and informally at a wide variety of occasions, for example when visiting a Basque cider house, to give voice to a particular emotion or to settle a debate.

More formal competitions are ofte held at occasions such as town festivals or fairs. The most important over-regional competitions are the 
 Arabako Bertsolari Txapelketa in Álava
 Bizkaiko Bertsolari Txapelketa in Biscay
 Gipuzkoako Bertsolari Txapelketa in Gipuzkoa
 Nafarroako Bertsolari Txapelketa in Navarre
 Iparraldeko Bertsolari Txapelketa in the Northern Basque Country

The Txapelketa Nagusia

Above the provincial level, there is the Euskal Herriko Bertsolari Txapelketa Nagusia or "Great Bertsolari Championship of the Basque Country." This has been held (with considerable gaps due to the Second World War and the Spanish Civil War) since 1935 and involves local and regional heats prior to the finale.

Maialen Lujanbio

In 2009, Maialen Lujanbio Zugasti became the first woman to win the championship. Her solo challenge was as follows: Maialen, you are a doctor. You're observing two children suffering from cancer organising a wheelchair race in a hospital corridor.

In 2017 and 2022 she won the contest for a second and third time, becoming the only woman to have won it thrice.

Famous Bertsolaris
Most historic bertsolaris were generally known by their nickname, usually stemming from the family house or farm, not their given name (given in brackets).

Historic Bertsolaris

 Basarri (Inazio Eizmendi, 1913–1999) Gipuzkoa
 Bilintx (Indalezio Bizkarrondo, 1831–1876) Gipuzkoa
 Bordel (Joan Etxamendi Larralde, 1792–1879) Navarre
 Etxahun (Pierre Topet, 1786–1862) Soule
 Etxahun-Iruri (Pierre Bordazarra, 1908–79)  Soule
 Etxamendi (Jean Etxamendi 1873-1962) Lower Navarre
 Lexoti (Jose Luis Lekuona (1925–2006) Gipuzkoa
 Lazkao Txiki (Joxe Migel Iztueta Kortajarena, 1926–1993) Gipuzkoa
 Mattin (Mattin Treku Inhargue, 1916–1981) Labourd
 Otaño (Pello Mari Otaño Barriola, 1857–1910) Gipuzkoa
 Pello Errota (Pedro Jose Elizegi, 1840–1919) Gipuzkoa
 Pernando Amezketarra (Fernando Bengoetxea Altuna, 1764–1823) Gipuzkoa
 Piarres Ibarrart (1838–1919) Labourd
 Txirrita (Jose Manuel Lujanbio Erretegi, 1860–1936) Gipuzkoa
 Urretxindorra (Kepa Enbeita Renteria, 1878–1942) Biscay
 Uztapide (Manuel Olaizola Urbieta, 1909–1983) Gipuzkoa
 Xalbador (Ferdinand Aire Etxart, 1920–1976) Lower Navarre
 Xanpun (Manuel Sein, 1928–2002) Labourd
 Xenpelar (Frantzisko Petrirena Errekondo, 1835–1869) Gipuzkoa
 Zepai (Akilino Izagirre Amenabar, 1906–1971) Gipuzkoa

Modern Bertsolaris
 Xabier Amuriza Sarrionandia (1941)  Biscay
 Amets Arzallus Antia (1983) Labourd
 Sustrai Colina Akordarrementeria (1983)  Labourd
 Andoni Egaña Makazaga (1961) Gipuzkoa
 Igor Elortza Aranoa (1975)  Biscay
 Jon Embeita Ealo (1950) Biscay
 Unai Iturriaga Zugaza-Artaza (1974) Biscay
 Maialen Lujanbio Zugasti (1976)  Gipuzkoa
 Jon Maia Soria (1972) Gipuzkoa
 Jon Martin Etxebeste (1981) Gipuzkoa
 Mañukorta (Gregorio Larrañaga Mandiola, 1943) Biscay
 Oihane Perea Perez de Mendiola (1977) Álava
 Xabier Silveira Etxeberria (1976) Navarre
 Aitor Usandizaga Izagirre (1976) Lower Navarre

Similar traditions

Other cultures have traditions of sung extemporary verse not unlike bertsolaritza. Amongst them are the Austro-Bavarian Gstanzl, the Italian improvvisatori, and the Sardinian mutos (also known as mutettus, repentina or ottada in different parts of the island.

Modernly bertsolaris have established contact with the Spanish-language traditions of Argentinian payadores and Cuban décimas.
The singer Fermin Muguruza has experimented with bertso-hop, drawing from bertso and rap music.

See also 

 16th-century Basque literature

References

Further reading 
 Amuriza, Xabier, Zu ere bertsolari, Elkar, 1982.
White, L. (2003). Basque Bertsolaritza. Oral Tradition, 18(1), 142-143. 
Sarasua, J. (2008). Social Features Of Bertsolaritza. Oral Tradition, 22(2), 33-46. 
Garzia Garmendia, J. (2008). History of Improvised Bertsolaritza : A Proposal.Oral Tradition, 22(2), 77-115. 
Foley, J. (2008). Basque Oral Poetry Championship. Oral Tradition, 22(2), 3-11. 
Amuriza, X. (1981). Bertsolaritza, 1: hitzaren kirol nazionala.

External links

 Bertsolari, a trailer of a documentary on bertsolaritza by Asier Altuna with English subtitles
 Bertso Eskolak (Bertso Schools)
 Bertsozale Elkartea (Society of Bertso Aficionados)
 Articles of the Oral Tradition Journal
 Spanish-language Auñamendi Basque Encyclopedia:
Bertsolarismo
Bertsolarismo (siglo XX)
Bertsolarismo (siglo XXI)

19th-century music genres
20th-century music genres
21st-century music genres

Music of French subdivisions
Music of Spain by autonomous community
Improvisation
Genres of poetry
Song forms